Visa requirements for Latvian non-citizens are administrative entry restrictions by the authorities of other states placed on Non-citizens of Latvia.


Visa requirements map

Visa-free access
Non-citizens of Latvia may enter the following countries and territories without a visa:

See also

 Visa requirements for Latvian citizens
 Latvian passport

References

Latvian non-citizens
Human rights in Latvia
Latvian nationality law